Charlestown Breachway State Beach is a seaside public recreation area on Block Island Sound in the town of Charlestown, Rhode Island. It is located on the east side of the manmade channel (the "Breachway") that connects Ninigret Pond with the Atlantic Ocean.

History
The first attempt to create a breachway from Pawaget/Ninigret/Charlestown Pond to the ocean in 1897 ended in failure although $1000 had been awarded to the cause.
 
In 1904, the General Assembly appropriated $5000 for construction of a permanent breachway that would help the pond from becoming brackish and unsuitable for cultivating oysters. Colonel Rodman of the Rhode Island Engineers Office surveyed the site and proposed building jetties on either side of the breachway. The contract was awarded to John Bristow of South Kingstown, who had built the breakwater at Point Judith. Stone for the east jetty was carried to the site by a horse-drawn narrow-gauge railroad.

In 1951, the Rhode Island Division of Harbors and Rivers awarded a contract to rebuild the east wall and construct the west wall to a Westerly company, Gencarelli Inc. After four months of work in severe weather, the Charleston Beachway Beach was officially opened on April 7, 1952.

Activities and amenities
The area offers 75 camping sites for self-contained RVs, ocean swimming, beach activities, salt-water fishing, and a boat launch. It is open seasonally.

References

External links

Charlestown Breachway Rhode Island Department of Environmental Management Division of Parks & Recreation

State parks of Rhode Island
Beaches of Rhode Island
Charlestown, Rhode Island
Protected areas of Washington County, Rhode Island
Beaches of Washington County, Rhode Island
Protected areas established in 1952
1952 establishments in Rhode Island